Pilkington Football Club is a football club based in St Helens, Merseyside, England.

History
The club was established in 1938 and joined both the Liverpool Business Houses League and the St Helens Combination. The name originates from the Pilkington glass factory in St. Helens. They later became members of the Liverpool County Football Combination. In 1980 the club joined Division Two of the Mid-Cheshire League. When Division Two was abolished in 1983, they became part of the league's single division. The club finished bottom of the league in 1986–87.

A new second division of the Mid-Cheshire League was formed in 1987 and Pilkington became members of Division One. However, after finishing bottom of the league in 1988–89 and 1990–91, they were relegated to Division Two. The club were Division Two runners-up in 1997–98, resulting in promotion to Division One. They finished bottom of the division in 1999–2000, but were reprieved from relegation after another left the league. The following season saw the club win the Liverpool Junior Cup, a trophy the club won again in 2004–05. In 2007 the league was renamed the Cheshire League.

In 2010–11 Pilkington were runners-up in Division One, missing out on the title on goal difference. The division was renamed the Premier Division in 2014. The club finished bottom of the Premier Division in 2014–15 and were relegated to Division One. They won the league's Presidents Cup in 2016–17, and after finishing as runners-up in Division One in 2017–18, the club were promoted back to the Premier Division. The following season saw them win the Premier Division title, resulting in promotion to Division One North of the North West Counties League.

Ground
The club originally played at Crossley Road. They moved to Ruskin Drive at the beginning of the 1948–49 season.

Honours
Cheshire League
Premier Division champions 2018–19
Presidents Cup winners 2016–17
Liverpool Junior Cup
Winners 2000–01, 2004–05

See also
Pilkington F.C. players

References

External links

Football clubs in England
Football clubs in Merseyside
Sport in St Helens, Merseyside
1938 establishments in England
Association football clubs established in 1938
Liverpool County Football Combination
Cheshire Association Football League
North West Counties Football League clubs
Works association football teams in England
Fan-owned football clubs in England